The 1989 VFL season was the 93rd season of the Victorian Football League (VFL), the highest level senior Australian rules football competition and administrative body in Victoria and, by reason of it featuring clubs from New South Wales, Queensland and Western Australia, the de facto highest level senior competition in Australia. The season featured fourteen clubs, ran from 31 March until 30 September, and comprised a 22-game home-and-away season followed by a finals series featuring the top five clubs. 

The premiership was won by the Hawthorn Football Club for the eighth time and second time consecutively, after it defeated  by six points in the 1989 VFL Grand Final.

Night Series

Premiership season

Round 1

|- bgcolor="#CCCCFF"
| Home team
| Home score
| Away team
| Away score
| Venue
| Crowd
| Date
|- bgcolor="#FFFFFF"
| 
| 14.12 (96)
| 
| 17.10 (112)
| WACA Ground
| 25,664
| 31 March 1989
|- bgcolor="#FFFFFF"
| 
| 10.13 (73)
| 
| 19.18 (132)
| Princes Park
| 22,000
| 1 April 1989
|- bgcolor="#FFFFFF"
| 
| 18.8 (116)
| 
| 16.15 (111)
| MCG
| 25,792
| 1 April 1989
|- bgcolor="#FFFFFF"
| 
| 20.16 (136)
| 
| 15.7 (97)
| Moorabbin Oval
| 17,236
| 1 April 1989
|- bgcolor="#FFFFFF"
| 
| 13.15 (93)
| 
| 11.17 (83)
| VFL Park
| 50,287
| 1 April 1989
|- bgcolor="#FFFFFF"
| 
| 12.17 (89)
| 
| 11.7 (73)
| SCG
| 8,611
| 2 April 1989
|- bgcolor="#FFFFFF"
| 
| 18.17 (125)
| 
| 17.21 (123)
| MCG
| 24,383
| 2 April 1989

Round 2

|- bgcolor="#CCCCFF"
| Home team
| Home team score
| Away team
| Away team score
| Venue
| Crowd
| Date
|- bgcolor="#FFFFFF"
| 
| 14.10 (94)
| 
| 9.14 (68)
| Windy Hill
| 20,123
| 8 April 1989
|- bgcolor="#FFFFFF"
| 
| 24.12 (156)
| 
| 13.10 (88)
| MCG
| 22,835
| 8 April 1989
|- bgcolor="#FFFFFF"
| 
| 20.12 (132)
| 
| 16.11 (107)
| Princes Park
| 23,837
| 8 April 1989
|- bgcolor="#FFFFFF"
| 
| 13.18 (96)
| 
| 13.14 (92)
| Moorabbin Oval
| 27,796
| 8 April 1989
|- bgcolor="#FFFFFF"
| 
| 11.6 (72)
| 
| 21.15 (141)
| VFL Park
| 18,939
| 8 April 1989
|- bgcolor="#FFFFFF"
| 
| 26.19 (175)
| 
| 11.14 (80)
| Kardinia Park
| 19,926
| 9 April 1989
|- bgcolor="#FFFFFF"
| 
| 18.15 (123)
| 
| 8.17 (65)
| Carrara Stadium
| 11,405
| 9 April 1989

Round 3

|- bgcolor="#CCCCFF"
| Home team
| Home team score
| Away team
| Away team score
| Venue
| Crowd
| Date
|- bgcolor="#FFFFFF"
| 
| 8.18 (66)
| 
| 12.12 (84)
| Western Oval
| 14,926
| 15 April 1989
|- bgcolor="#FFFFFF"
| 
| 8.13 (61)
| 
| 18.14 (122)
| MCG
| 32,580
| 15 April 1989
|- bgcolor="#FFFFFF"
| 
| 20.15 (135)
| 
| 13.13 (91)
| Princes Park
| 23,618
| 15 April 1989
|- bgcolor="#FFFFFF"
| 
| 19.21 (135)
| 
| 11.9 (75)
| Victoria Park
| 18,240
| 15 April 1989
|- bgcolor="#FFFFFF"
| 
| 19.8 (122)
| 
| 19.18 (132)
| VFL Park
| 31,780
| 15 April 1989
|- bgcolor="#FFFFFF"
| 
| 20.14 (134)
| 
| 11.17 (83)
| SCG
| 11,298
| 16 April 1989
|- bgcolor="#FFFFFF"
| 
| 16.21 (117)
| 
| 9.10 (64)
| Kardinia Park
| 27,475
| 16 April 1989

Round 4

|- bgcolor="#CCCCFF"
| Home team
| Home team score
| Away team
| Away team score
| Venue
| Crowd
| Date
|- bgcolor="#FFFFFF"
| 
| 11.13 (79)
| 
| 7.11 (53)
| MCG
| 17,560
| 21 April 1989
|- bgcolor="#FFFFFF"
| 
| 11.13 (79)
| 
| 23.15 (153)
| Princes Park
| 13,027
| 22 April 1989
|- bgcolor="#FFFFFF"
| 
| 23.21 (159)
| 
| 14.11 (95)
| Victoria Park
| 27,304
| 22 April 1989
|- bgcolor="#FFFFFF"
| 
| 12.15 (87)
| 
| 14.15 (99)
| Western Oval
| 22,844
| 23 April 1989
|- bgcolor="#FFFFFF"
| 
| 10.12 (72)
| 
| 18.7 (115)
| WACA Ground
| 18,546
| 23 April 1989
|- bgcolor="#FFFFFF"
| 
| 15.20 (110)
| 
| 21.12 (138)
| Princes Park
| 31,492
| 25 April 1989
|- bgcolor="#FFFFFF"
| 
| 9.12 (66)
| 
| 15.20 (110)
| VFL Park
| 41,347
| 25 April 1989

Round 5

|- bgcolor="#CCCCFF"
| Home team
| Home team score
| Away team
| Away team score
| Venue
| Crowd
| Date
|- bgcolor="#FFFFFF"
| 
| 16.17 (113)
| 
| 16.16 (112)
| Princes Park
| 13,377
| 29 April 1989
|- bgcolor="#FFFFFF"
| 
| 20.18 (138)
| 
| 12.12 (84)
| Windy Hill
| 18,694
| 29 April 1989
|- bgcolor="#FFFFFF"
| 
| 11.16 (82)
| 
| 10.11 (71)
| MCG
| 25,273
| 29 April 1989
|- bgcolor="#FFFFFF"
| 
| 18.17 (125)
| 
| 10.11 (71)
| VFL Park
| 31,827
| 29 April 1989
|- bgcolor="#FFFFFF"
| 
| 20.14 (134)
| 
| 26.15 (171)
| MCG
| 19,691
| 30 April 1989
|- bgcolor="#FFFFFF"
| 
| 10.13 (73)
| 
| 19.11 (125)
| Carrara Stadium
| 9,694
| 30 April 1989
|- bgcolor="#FFFFFF"
| 
| 10.17 (77)
| 
| 9.12 (66)
| SCG
| 22,490
| 30 April 1989

Round 6

|- bgcolor="#CCCCFF"
| Home team
| Home team score
| Away team
| Away team score
| Venue
| Crowd
| Date
|- bgcolor="#FFFFFF"
| 
| 12.9 (81)
| 
| 12.17 (89)
| WACA Ground
| 21,268
| 5 May 1989
|- bgcolor="#FFFFFF"
| 
| 13.17 (95)
| 
| 9.13 (67)
| Moorabbin Oval
| 20,285
| 6 May 1989
|- bgcolor="#FFFFFF"
| 
| 26.15 (171)
| 
| 25.13 (163)
| Princes Park
| 17,645
| 6 May 1989
|- bgcolor="#FFFFFF"
| 
| 9.10 (64)
| 
| 18.16 (124)
| MCG
| 67,239
| 6 May 1989
|- bgcolor="#FFFFFF"
| 
| 15.12 (102)
| 
| 9.12 (66)
| VFL Park
| 31,287
| 6 May 1989
|- bgcolor="#FFFFFF"
| 
| 8.11 (59)
| 
| 6.15 (51)
| Carrara Stadium
| 5,134
| 7 May 1989
|- bgcolor="#FFFFFF"
| 
| 17.19 (121)
| 
| 16.9 (105)
| MCG
| 34,379
| 7 May 1989

Round 7

|- bgcolor="#CCCCFF"
| Home team
| Home team score
| Away team
| Away team score
| Venue
| Crowd
| Date
|- bgcolor="#FFFFFF"
| 
| 7.16 (58)
| 
| 9.13 (67)
| SCG
| 13,875
| 12 May 1989
|- bgcolor="#FFFFFF"
| 
| 35.18 (228)
| 
| 16.13 (109)
| Kardinia Park
| 21,294
| 13 May 1989
|- bgcolor="#FFFFFF"
| 
| 16.10 (106)
| 
| 11.12 (78)
| Victoria Park
| 23,523
| 13 May 1989
|- bgcolor="#FFFFFF"
| 
| 25.15 (165)
| 
| 13.6 (84)
| Princes Park
| 16,644
| 13 May 1989
|- bgcolor="#FFFFFF"
| 
| 12.14 (86)
| 
| 11.14 (80)
| MCG
| 35,199
| 13 May 1989
|- bgcolor="#FFFFFF"
| 
| 13.14 (92)
| 
| 13.12 (90)
| VFL Park
| 11,745
| 13 May 1989
|- bgcolor="#FFFFFF"
| 
| 12.9 (81)
| 
| 17.10 (112)
| Carrara Stadium
| 12,034
| 14 May 1989

Round 8

|- bgcolor="#CCCCFF"
| Home team
| Home team score
| Away team
| Away team score
| Venue
| Crowd
| Date
|- bgcolor="#FFFFFF"
| 
| 22.25 (157)
| 
| 12.11 (83)
| Princes Park
| 14,388
| 20 May 1989
|- bgcolor="#FFFFFF"
| 
| 21.19 (145)
| 
| 12.15 (87)
| Windy Hill
| 18,047
| 20 May 1989
|- bgcolor="#FFFFFF"
| 
| 18.7 (115)
| 
| 17.10 (112)
| Moorabbin Oval
| 19,193
| 20 May 1989
|- bgcolor="#FFFFFF"
| 
| 8.16 (64)
| 
| 9.9 (63)
| Western Oval
| 11,926
| 20 May 1989
|- bgcolor="#FFFFFF"
| 
| 26.23 (179)
| 
| 6.14 (50)
| Kardinia Park
| 17,236
| 20 May 1989
|- bgcolor="#FFFFFF"
| 
| 12.8 (80)
| 
| 16.13 (109)
| VFL Park
| 61,237
| 20 May 1989
|- bgcolor="#FFFFFF"
| 
| 12.21 (93)
| 
| 13.17 (95)
| Subiaco Oval
| 16,017
| 21 May 1989

Round 9

|- bgcolor="#CCCCFF"
| Home team
| Home team score
| Away team
| Away team score
| Venue
| Crowd
| Date
|- bgcolor="#FFFFFF"
| 
| 25.15 (165)
| 
| 10.11 (71)
| MCG
| 8,634
| 26 May 1989
|- bgcolor="#FFFFFF"
| 
| 18.10 (118)
| 
| 12.11 (83)
| Moorabbin Oval
| 15,768
| 27 May 1989
|- bgcolor="#FFFFFF"
| 
| 24.15 (159)
| 
| 18.14 (122)
| Princes Park
| 19,520
| 27 May 1989
|- bgcolor="#FFFFFF"
| 
| 10.17 (77)
| 
| 32.19 (211)
| MCG
| 24,321
| 27 May 1989
|- bgcolor="#FFFFFF"
| 
| 19.11 (125)
| 
| 7.16 (58)
| VFL Park
| 71,390
| 27 May 1989
|- bgcolor="#FFFFFF"
| 
| 10.13 (73)
| 
| 17.15 (117)
| Western Oval
| 16,437
| 28 May 1989
|- bgcolor="#FFFFFF"
| 
| 6.7 (43)
| 
| 6.16 (52)
| SCG
| 13,475
| 28 May 1989

Round 10

|- bgcolor="#CCCCFF"
| Home team
| Home team score
| Away team
| Away team score
| Venue
| Crowd
| Date
|- bgcolor="#FFFFFF"
| 
| 12.11 (83)
| 
| 16.17 (113)
| MCG
| 27,159
| 2 June 1989
|- bgcolor="#FFFFFF"
| 
| 14.14 (98)
| 
| 10.6 (66)
| Western Oval
| 10,170
| 3 June 1989
|- bgcolor="#FFFFFF"
| 
| 18.14 (122)
| 
| 10.9 (69)
| Windy Hill
| 15,684
| 3 June 1989
|- bgcolor="#FFFFFF"
| 
| 17.13 (115)
| 
| 18.10 (118)
| Princes Park
| 12,247
| 3 June 1989
|- bgcolor="#FFFFFF"
| 
| 13.21 (99)
| 
| 13.14 (92)
| VFL Park
| 24,839
| 3 June 1989
|- bgcolor="#FFFFFF"
| 
| 23.16 (154)
| 
| 13.10 (88)
| MCG
| 65,187
| 3 June 1989
|- bgcolor="#FFFFFF"
| 
| 15.15 (105)
| 
| 16.14 (110)
| Subiaco Oval
| 20,213
| 4 June 1989

Round 11

|- bgcolor="#CCCCFF"
| Home team
| Home team score
| Away team
| Away team score
| Venue
| Crowd
| Date
|- bgcolor="#FFFFFF"
| 
| 8.9 (57)
| 
| 12.13 (85)
| SCG
| 13,703
| 9 June 1989
|- bgcolor="#FFFFFF"
| 
| 1.8 (14)
| 
| 6.13 (49)
| Princes Park
| 7,921
| 10 June 1989
|- bgcolor="#FFFFFF"
| 
| 5.15 (45)
| 
| 3.8 (26)
| MCG
| 7,966
| 10 June 1989
|- bgcolor="#FFFFFF"
| 
| 9.8 (62)
| 
| 7.12 (54)
| VFL Park
| 17,060
| 10 June 1989
|- bgcolor="#FFFFFF"
| 
| 11.15 (81)
| 
| 17.14 (116)
| Subiaco Oval
| 20,233
| 11 June 1989
|- bgcolor="#FFFFFF"
| 
| 8.6 (54)
| 
| 10.9 (69)
| Princes Park
| 21,716
| 12 June 1989
|- bgcolor="#FFFFFF"
| 
| 12.17 (89)
| 
| 4.11 (35)
| MCG
| 87,653
| 12 June 1989

Round 12

|- bgcolor="#CCCCFF"
| Home team
| Home team score
| Away team
| Away team score
| Venue
| Crowd
| Date
|- bgcolor="#FFFFFF"
| 
| 16.9 (105)
| 
| 11.11 (77)
| WACA Ground
| 13,783
| 16 June 1989
|- bgcolor="#FFFFFF"
| 
| 7.8 (50)
| 
| 7.13 (55)
| Windy Hill
| 13,398
| 17 June 1989
|- bgcolor="#FFFFFF"
| 
| 7.9 (51)
| 
| 5.10 (40)
| Princes Park
| 16,111
| 17 June 1989
|- bgcolor="#FFFFFF"
| 
| 8.6 (54)
| 
| 10.12 (72)
| Moorabbin Oval
| 18,124
| 17 June 1989
|- bgcolor="#FFFFFF"
| 
| 2.8 (20)
| 
| 13.11 (89)
| MCG
| 38,128
| 17 June 1989
|- bgcolor="#FFFFFF"
| 
| 18.15 (123)
| 
| 9.15 (69)
| VFL Park
| 26,557
| 17 June 1989
|- bgcolor="#FFFFFF"
| 
| 18.6 (114)
| 
| 19.14 (128)
| Carrara Stadium
| 10,008
| 18 June 1989

Round 13

|- bgcolor="#CCCCFF"
| Home team
| Home team score
| Away team
| Away team score
| Venue
| Crowd
| Date
|- bgcolor="#FFFFFF"
| 
| 15.16 (106)
| 
| 4.11 (35)
| VFL Park
| 6,292
| 23 June 1989
|- bgcolor="#FFFFFF"
| 
| 3.10 (28)
| 
| 3.5 (23)
| Windy Hill
| 13,559
| 24 June 1989
|- bgcolor="#FFFFFF"
| 
| 14.24 (108)
| 
| 8.8 (56)
| Victoria Park
| 21,210
| 24 June 1989
|- bgcolor="#FFFFFF"
| 
| 9.10 (64)
| 
| 5.11 (41)
| Princes Park
| 11,995
| 24 June 1989
|- bgcolor="#FFFFFF"
| 
| 8.8 (56)
| 
| 10.4 (64)
| Moorabbin Oval
| 19,040
| 24 June 1989
|- bgcolor="#FFFFFF"
| 
| 15.5 (95)
| 
| 9.13 (67)
| VFL Park
| 12,424
| 24 June 1989
|- bgcolor="#FFFFFF"
| 
| 14.19 (103)
| 
| 16.15 (111)
| SCG
| 12,967
| 25 June 1989

Round 14

|- bgcolor="#CCCCFF"
| Home team
| Home team score
| Away team
| Away team score
| Venue
| Crowd
| Date
|- bgcolor="#FFFFFF"
| 
| 18.19 (127)
| 
| 9.13 (67)
| MCG
| 19,354
| 7 July 1989
|- bgcolor="#FFFFFF"
| 
| 10.15 (75)
| 
| 7.8 (50)
| MCG
| 12,601
| 8 July 1989
|- bgcolor="#FFFFFF"
| 
| 19.27 (141)
| 
| 6.14 (50)
| Princes Park
| 8,028
| 8 July 1989
|- bgcolor="#FFFFFF"
| 
| 11.16 (82)
| 
| 8.10 (58)
| Kardinia Park
| 18,231
| 8 July 1989
|- bgcolor="#FFFFFF"
| 
| 9.7 (61)
| 
| 8.10 (58)
| VFL Park
| 34,617
| 8 July 1989
|- bgcolor="#FFFFFF"
| 
| 14.15 (99)
| 
| 17.11 (113)
| Carrara Stadium
| 8,799
| 9 July 1989
|- bgcolor="#FFFFFF"
| 
| 15.15 (105)
| 
| 7.15 (57)
| Western Oval
| 18,775
| 9 July 1989

Round 15

|- bgcolor="#CCCCFF"
| Home team
| Home team score
| Away team
| Away team score
| Venue
| Crowd
| Date
|- bgcolor="#FFFFFF"
| 
| 17.15 (117)
| 
| 11.15 (81)
| MCG
| 23,764
| 15 July 1989
|- bgcolor="#FFFFFF"
| 
| 12.20 (92)
| 
| 13.8 (86)
| Princes Park
| 11,017
| 15 July 1989
|- bgcolor="#FFFFFF"
| 
| 25.10 (160)
| 
| 1.12 (18)
| Windy Hill
| 11,503
| 15 July 1989
|- bgcolor="#FFFFFF"
| 
| 11.11 (77)
| 
| 22.19 (151)
| Carrara Stadium
| 18,198
| 15 July 1989
|- bgcolor="#FFFFFF"
| 
| 12.18 (90)
| 
| 15.6 (96)
| VFL Park
| 44,548
| 15 July 1989
|- bgcolor="#FFFFFF"
| 
| 15.14 (104)
| 
| 22.10 (142)
| MCG
| 17,894
| 16 July 1989
|- bgcolor="#FFFFFF"
| 
| 16.21 (117)
| 
| 10.17 (77)
| SCG
| 8,010
| 16 July 1989

Round 16

|- bgcolor="#CCCCFF"
| Home team
| Home team score
| Away team
| Away team score
| Venue
| Crowd
| Date
|- bgcolor="#FFFFFF"
| 
| 14.10 (94)
| 
| 12.18 (90)
| Carrara Stadium
| 11,004
| 22 July 1989
|- bgcolor="#FFFFFF"
| 
| 9.12 (66)
| 
| 14.15 (99)
| MCG
| 23,964
| 22 July 1989
|- bgcolor="#FFFFFF"
| 
| 21.11 (137)
| 
| 11.11 (77)
| Princes Park
| 20,367
| 22 July 1989
|- bgcolor="#FFFFFF"
| 
| 6.10 (46)
| 
| 6.10 (46)
| Western Oval
| 15,089
| 22 July 1989
|- bgcolor="#FFFFFF"
| 
| 17.7 (109)
| 
| 16.16 (112)
| VFL Park
| 38,865
| 22 July 1989
|- bgcolor="#FFFFFF"
| 
| 16.16 (112)
| 
| 9.16 (70)
| Subiaco Oval
| 13,299
| 23 July 1989
|- bgcolor="#FFFFFF"
| 
| 8.18 (66)
| 
| 16.11 (107)
| MCG
| 13,173
| 23 July 1989

Round 17

|- bgcolor="#CCCCFF"
| Home team
| Home team score
| Away team
| Away team score
| Venue
| Crowd
| Date
|- bgcolor="#FFFFFF"
| 
| 6.15 (51)
| 
| 18.15 (123)
| MCG
| 15,045
| 28 July 1989
|- bgcolor="#FFFFFF"
| 
| 15.16 (106)
| 
| 10.19 (79)
| Princes Park
| 20,277
| 29 July 1989
|- bgcolor="#FFFFFF"
| 
| 16.10 (106)
| 
| 20.13 (133)
| Moorabbin Oval
| 17,000
| 29 July 1989
|- bgcolor="#FFFFFF"
| 
| 9.24 (78)
| 
| 23.16 (154)
| VFL Park
| 15,523
| 29 July 1989
|- bgcolor="#FFFFFF"
| 
| 19.11 (125)
| 
| 14.20 (104)
| MCG
| 35,217
| 29 July 1989
|- bgcolor="#FFFFFF"
| 
| 10.12 (72)
| 
| 16.13 (109)
| Western Oval
| 9,467
| 30 July 1989
|- bgcolor="#FFFFFF"
| 
| 12.23 (95)
| 
| 9.16 (70)
| SCG
| 7,437
| 30 July 1989

Round 18

|- bgcolor="#CCCCFF"
| Home team
| Home team score
| Away team
| Away team score
| Venue
| Crowd
| Date
|- bgcolor="#FFFFFF"
| 
| 23.13 (151)
| 
| 15.13 (103)
| Princes Park
| 11,236
| 5 August 1989
|- bgcolor="#FFFFFF"
| 
| 11.15 (81)
| 
| 12.13 (85)
| Victoria Park
| 17,621
| 5 August 1989
|- bgcolor="#FFFFFF"
| 
| 25.17 (167)
| 
| 12.12 (84)
| Carrara Stadium
| 9,606
| 5 August 1989
|- bgcolor="#FFFFFF"
| 
| 13.12 (90)
| 
| 17.11 (113)
| Moorabbin Oval
| 14,243
| 5 August 1989
|- bgcolor="#FFFFFF"
| 
| 14.6 (90)
| 
| 14.11 (95)
| VFL Park
| 33,615
| 5 August 1989
|- bgcolor="#FFFFFF"
| 
| 19.16 (130)
| 
| 10.19 (79)
| Subiaco Oval
| 17,660
| 6 August 1989
|- bgcolor="#FFFFFF"
| 
| 3.5 (23)
| 
| 7.9 (51)
| Western Oval
| 16,005
| 6 August 1989

Round 19

|- bgcolor="#CCCCFF"
| Home team
| Home team score
| Away team
| Away team score
| Venue
| Crowd
| Date
|- bgcolor="#FFFFFF"
| 
| 11.10 (76)
| 
| 15.14 (104)
| VFL Park
| 14,783
| 11 August 1989
|- bgcolor="#FFFFFF"
| 
| 11.6 (72)
| 
| 5.10 (40)
| Princes Park
| 6,920
| 12 August 1989
|- bgcolor="#FFFFFF"
| 
| 15.11 (101)
| 
| 7.5 (47)
| Windy Hill
| 11,878
| 12 August 1989
|- bgcolor="#FFFFFF"
| 
| 9.9 (63)
| 
| 12.15 (87)
| VFL Park
| 28,117
| 12 August 1989
|- bgcolor="#FFFFFF"
| 
| 18.16 (124)
| 
| 10.14 (74)
| Kardinia Park
| 17,977
| 12 August 1989
|- bgcolor="#FFFFFF"
| 
| 11.14 (80)
| 
| 11.12 (78)
| VFL Park
| 21,027
| 13 August 1989
|- bgcolor="#FFFFFF"
| 
| 25.9 (159)
| 
| 16.13 (109)
| SCG
| 11,583
| 13 August 1989

Round 20

|- bgcolor="#CCCCFF"
| Home team
| Home team score
| Away team
| Away team score
| Venue
| Crowd
| Date
|- bgcolor="#FFFFFF"
| 
| 18.18 (126)
| 
| 12.10 (82)
| WACA Ground
| 15,721
| 18 August 1989
|- bgcolor="#FFFFFF"
| 
| 14.14 (98)
| 
| 12.15 (87)
| MCG
| 16,304
| 19 August 1989
|- bgcolor="#FFFFFF"
| 
| 15.17 (107)
| 
| 3.11 (29)
| Western Oval
| 8,673
| 19 August 1989
|- bgcolor="#FFFFFF"
| 
| 19.14 (128)
| 
| 17.10 (112)
| Windy Hill
| 15,912
| 19 August 1989
|- bgcolor="#FFFFFF"
| 
| 20.13 (133)
| 
| 20.12 (132)
| Princes Park
| 15,227
| 19 August 1989
|- bgcolor="#FFFFFF"
| 
| 10.11 (71)
| 
| 14.20 (104)
| VFL Park
| 42,111
| 19 August 1989
|- bgcolor="#FFFFFF"
| 
| 12.5 (77)
| 
| 9.7 (61)
| Carrara Stadium
| 9,093
| 20 August 1989

Round 21

|- bgcolor="#CCCCFF"
| Home team
| Home team score
| Away team
| Away team score
| Venue
| Crowd
| Date
|- bgcolor="#FFFFFF"
| 
| 15.20 (110)
| 
| 15.14 (104)
| SCG
| 12,042
| 25 August 1989
|- bgcolor="#FFFFFF"
| 
| 10.12 (72)
| 
| 16.8 (104)
| MCG
| 19,645
| 26 August 1989
|- bgcolor="#FFFFFF"
| 
| 20.19 (139)
| 
| 17.15 (117)
| Kardinia Park
| 16,940
| 26 August 1989
|- bgcolor="#FFFFFF"
| 
| 12.11 (83)
| 
| 4.13 (37)
| Victoria Park
| 16,657
| 26 August 1989
|- bgcolor="#FFFFFF"
| 
| 19.20 (134)
| 
| 8.11 (59)
| Princes Park
| 10,178
| 26 August 1989
|- bgcolor="#FFFFFF"
| 
| 10.8 (68)
| 
| 12.9 (81)
| VFL Park
| 6,622
| 26 August 1989
|- bgcolor="#FFFFFF"
| 
| 21.22 (148)
| 
| 10.12 (72)
| Subiaco Oval
| 23,781
| 27 August 1989

Round 22

|- bgcolor="#CCCCFF"
| Home team
| Home team score
| Away team
| Away team score
| Venue
| Crowd
| Date
|- bgcolor="#FFFFFF"
| 
| 13.15 (93)
| 
| 21.10 (136)
| MCG
| 9,235
| 1 September 1989
|- bgcolor="#FFFFFF"
| 
| 23.24 (162)
| 
| 12.14 (86)
| Kardinia Park
| 20,743
| 2 September 1989
|- bgcolor="#FFFFFF"
| 
| 13.18 (96)
| 
| 12.9 (81)
| Princes Park
| 8,961
| 2 September 1989
|- bgcolor="#FFFFFF"
| 
| 20.9 (129)
| 
| 11.14 (80)
| Victoria Park
| 18,118
| 2 September 1989
|- bgcolor="#FFFFFF"
| 
| 13.11 (89)
| 
| 16.12 (108)
| MCG
| 41,080
| 2 September 1989
|- bgcolor="#FFFFFF"
| 
| 28.13 (181)
| 
| 13.13 (91)
| VFL Park
| 25,532
| 2 September 1989
|- bgcolor="#FFFFFF"
| 
| 15.15 (105)
| 
| 10.10 (70)
| Carrara Stadium
| 15,409
| 3 September 1989

Ladder

Finals series

Week one

Week two

Week three

Week four

Notable events
 In Round 6, Geelong's losing score of 25.13 (163) against Hawthorn remains the highest losing score in VFL/AFL history.
 The Tribunal was given extra authority when trial by video was introduced in Round 6. 's Michael Conlan and 's Doug Barwick became the first League players charged by the Commission on video evidence and both were suspended by the Tribunal. 
 The wettest Melbourne winter since 1952 saw horrible conditions between Rounds 11 and 13 that produced several unusually low scores: 
 in Round 11 on the Saturday before the Queen's Birthday, Fitzroy's score of 1.8 (14) was the lowest since Footscray kicked an identical score against Geelong in 1965, and the first single goal score since Carlton's 1.11 (17) on Anzac Day of 1968.
 on the same day, Brad Hardie kicked 3.4 (22) – with all three goals coming in the first fifteen minutes – of only 3.8 (26) scored by the Bears, this being the first time a player had kicked all his team's goals since Alex Ruscuklic on the same weekend of 1967.
 in Round 13, Essendon and Footscray played the lowest scoring game since the 1927 Grand Final, with the teams combining for only 6.15 (51) on a muddy Windy Hill.
 Geelong set a record for the most points scored in the home-and-away season, 2916. Footscray's season aggregate score of 1614 points was the lowest since 1972.

Player statistics and awards

Leading goalkickers

Abbreviation guide: Gms=Games played in the season, Gls/Bhds=Goals and behinds kicked, Acc%=Accuracy percentage (Goals divided by Goals + Behinds multiplied by 100), GpM=Average goals per match

Brownlow Medal count

 The Leigh Matthews Trophy was awarded to Tim Watson of Essendon. 
 The Norm Smith Medal was awarded to Gary Ablett of Geelong.
 The Under 19's Grand Final won by Richmond against North Melbourne*
 The Reserves Grand Final won by Fitzroy against Geelong.
 The Seniors Grand Final won by Hawthorn against Geelong.

 The Under 19's Grand Final was played at VFL Park the week after Under 19's Preliminary Final Replay and the Reserves Grand Final and Seniors Grand Final were played at the MCG

See also
 McIntyre "final five" system

Notes
Based on a qualification of a team total of three or more goals.

References

Bibliography
 Stephen Rodgers: Every Game Ever Played VFL/AFL Results 1897–1991 3rd Edition 1992. Penguin Books Australia .

External links
 1989 Season – AFL Tables

Australian Football League seasons
VFL season